Persoonia saundersiana is a species of flowering plant in the family Proteaceae and is endemic to the south-west of Western Australia. It is an erect, spreading shrub with hairy young branchlets, linear leaves, and bright yellow flowers borne in groups of up to twenty-five on a rachis up to  that continues to grow after flowering.

Description

Taxonomy
Persoonia saundersiana was first formally described in 1855 by Carl Meissner in Hooker's Journal of Botany and Kew Garden Miscellany from specimens collected by James Drummond.

Distribution and habitat
This geebung grows in scrub and mallee heath in the area between Minnivale, Tammin, Lake Hope and Comet Vale in the Avon Wheatbelt, Coolgardie, Geraldton Sandplains, Mallee, Murchison and Yalgoo biogeographic regions in the south-west of Western Australia.

Conservation status
Persoonia saundersiana is classified as "not threatened" by the Government of Western Australia Department of Parks and Wildlife.

References

saundersiana
Flora of Western Australia
Plants described in 1855
Taxa named by Richard Kippist